Jainca County, Chentsa County or Jainzha County is a county in Huangnan Tibetan Autonomous Prefecture in Qinghai Province, China, to Tibetans in the area known as Malho Prefecture, part of Amdo. There are six townships, three towns and a total of 79 administrative villages in Chentsa county. The county has an area of 1714 square kilometres and a population of ~50,000 (2001), 67% Tibetan. The county seat is the town of Markhu Thang.

Climate

See also
 Amdo Jampa
 List of administrative divisions of Qinghai

References

External links
Official website of Jainca County Government

County-level divisions of Qinghai
Amdo
Huangnan Tibetan Autonomous Prefecture